Annabel Johnson is an Australian rules footballer playing for the Geelong Football Club in the AFL Women's (AFLW). Johnson was recruited by Geelong with the 15th pick in the 2021 AFL Women's draft.

AFL Women's career
Johnson debuted for Geelong in the opening round of the 2021 AFL Women's season. On debut, Johnson collected 6 disposals and 3 marks. After stringing together 4 games, Johnson suffered a foot fracture in the team's round 5 win against , keeping her out of the team for the remainder of the season. 

Her AFL Women's season seven was a much more successful year. Playing every game, she became an important part of Geelong's backline, making the initial 44 player squad of the 22under22 team at the conclusion of the season.

Statistics
Updated to the end of S7, 2022.

|-
| 2022 ||  || 30
| 4 || 0 || 0 || 27 || 5 || 32 || 12 || 12 || 0.0 || 0.0 || 6.8 || 1.3 || 8.0 || 3.0 || 3.0 || 0
|-
| S7 (2022) ||  || 2
| 11 || 0 || 0 || 82 || 36 || 118 || 36 || 23 || 0.0 || 0.0 || 7.5 || 3.3 || 10.7 || 3.3 || 2.1 || 
|- class=sortbottom
! colspan=3 | Career
! 15 !! 0 !! 0 !! 109 !! 41 !! 150 !! 48 !! 35 !! 0.0 !! 0.0 !! 7.3 !! 2.7 !! 10.0 !! 3.2 !! 2.3 !! 0
|}

References

External links
 Annabel Johnson at AustralianFootball.com

2000 births
Living people
Geelong Football Club (AFLW) players
Australian rules footballers from Victoria (Australia)